Greg Lasker (born September 28, 1964) is a former American football defensive back who played three seasons in the National Football League (NFL) for the New York Giants, Chicago Bears, and Phoenix Cardinals.

Lasker was a starting safety at the University of Arkansas before being drafted into the NFL Draft in 1986. He was named to the Arkansas 1980–1989 All-Decade Team. He played high school football at Conway High School.

Greg is now a General Contractor and is the owner of "Lifestyle Homes by Greg Lasker" in Conway Arkansas.

https://www.laskerlifestyle.com/

References

1964 births
Living people
Players of American football from St. Louis
American football defensive backs
Arkansas Razorbacks football players
Chicago Bears players
New York Giants players
Phoenix Cardinals players